Christine Garner is a retired American female volleyball player, and 3 sport athlete at ASU. Christine was inducted into the Arizona State Hall of Fame in 2009. Garner still ranks No. 1 in the record books with 1,871 career kills, and led ASU volleyball to its two finest seasons in history. As one of the most illustrious players to ever take to the court for the Sun Devil volleyball program, Garner also ranks in the top 10 in career digs and service aces. She was a six-time Pac-10 Player of the Week and was also a recipient of a National Player of the Week honor. In addition to her numerous accolades at ASU, Garner was a two-time All-American and an all-Pac-10 performer. To cap off her stellar athletic career as a Sun Devil, Garner was also a star performer on the ASU softball team and captain to both the ASU women's volleyball and basketball team. Garner went on after college to be part of the United States women's national volleyball team.

She won the silver medal at the 1994 Goodwill Games. Other world class tournaments included the 1997 Grand Prix and the 1997 NORCECA tournament. She left the national team in 1997 and played two seasons with the European Professional Volleyball League in Turkey and Italy.

References

External links
 
 

1973 births
Living people
American women's volleyball players
People from Newport Beach, California
Outside hitters
Competitors at the 1994 Goodwill Games
21st-century American women
Volleyball players from California
Arizona State Sun Devils women's volleyball players
Arizona State Sun Devils softball players
Arizona State Sun Devils women's volleyball coaches